Kuran or Kooran (Persian: كورن) may refer to:

Places

Iran
 Kuran, East Azerbaijan, Iran
 Kuran, Bandar Abbas, Hormozgan Province, Iran
 Kuran, Bastak, Hormozgan Province, Iran
 Kooran, Baft, Kerman Province, Iran
 Kuran, Ravar, Kerman Province, Iran
 Kooran, Sirjan, Kerman Province, Iran
 Kuran, Sirjan, Kerman Province, Iran
 Kuran, North Khorasan, Iran
 Kuran-e Olya, Sistan and Baluchestan Province, Iran
 Kuran-e Sofla, Sistan and Baluchestan Province, Iran
 Kuran, Mahabad, West Azerbaijan Province, Iran
 Kuran, Urmia, West Azerbaijan Province, Iran
 Kuran-e Kordiyeh, Iran
 Kuran-e Torkiyeh, Iran

Elsewhere
 Kuran, Poland
 Kuran Islands, Western New Guinea, Indonesia

Other uses
 Kuran (surname)

See also

Quran, the central religious text of Islam